Dreams is a 1955 Swedish drama film directed by Ingmar Bergman.

Plot
Susanne is the owner of a model agency in Stockholm. Doris, her most popular model, has an argument with her fiancé, Palle, just before she goes with Susanne to Gothenburg to be photographed in a new collection.

In Gothenburg Doris meets an aging Consul, who sees in her a striking resemblance to his wife, now in a mental hospital. The Consul gratifies Doris's desires for fine clothes and jewelry, and the two spend a strenuously exciting day together, until his daughter arrives and ruthlessly exposes her father's egotism.

Susanne has meanwhile telephoned her ex-lover Henrik and arranged a rendezvous with him. Henrik reluctantly visits her. They make love and are planning to resume their relationship when his wife arrives.

She proves conclusively that Henrik is a weakling. Disillusioned, Susanne returns with Doris to Stockholm, where Doris's fiancé waits.

Cast
 Eva Dahlbeck as Susanne
 Harriet Andersson as Doris
 Gunnar Björnstrand as Otto Sönderby
 Ulf Palme as Mr. Henrik Lobelius
 Inga Landgré as Mrs. Lobelius
 Benkt-Åke Benktsson as Mr. Magnus 
 Sven Lindberg as Palle Palt
 Kerstin Hedeby as Marianne

Reception
Dreams is one of the few Ingmar Bergman films to have received lukewarm reviews (as opposed to a positive reception). The film ranked 6th on Cahiers du Cinéma's Top 10 Films of the Year List in 1958. Review aggregator Rotten Tomatoes reports 40% approval among five critics.

References

External links

1955 films
1955 drama films
Swedish drama films
1950s Swedish-language films
Films directed by Ingmar Bergman
Films with screenplays by Ingmar Bergman
Swedish black-and-white films
1950s Swedish films